James Valerio (born 1938) is a U.S. artist specializing in photorealist paintings. Valerio was educated at the School of the Art Institute of Chicago, receiving a BfA in 1966 and an MfA in 1968. His work is included in the collection of the Butler Institute of American Art and other museums.

References

Further reading
New York Times Art in Review, May 23, 2003

1938 births
Living people